This page lists all described genera and species of the spider family Dysderidae. , the World Spider Catalog accepts 625 species in 24 genera:

C

Cryptoparachtes

Cryptoparachtes Dunin, 1992
 Cryptoparachtes adzharicus Dunin, 1992 (type) — Georgia
 Cryptoparachtes charitonowi (Mcheidze, 1972) — Georgia
 Cryptoparachtes fedotovi (Charitonov, 1956) — Georgia, Azerbaijan

D

Dasumia

Dasumia Thorell, 1875
 Dasumia amoena (Kulczyński, 1897) — Eastern Europe, Russia (Caucasus)
 Dasumia canestrinii (L. Koch, 1876) — Southern Europe
 Dasumia carpatica (Kulczyński, 1882) — Eastern Europe
 Dasumia cephalleniae Brignoli, 1976 — Greece
 Dasumia chyzeri (Kulczyński, 1906) — Eastern Europe
 Dasumia crassipalpis (Simon, 1882) — Syria, Israel
 Dasumia diomedea Caporiacco, 1947 — Italy
 Dasumia gasparoi Kunt, Özkütük & Elverici, 2011 — Turkey
 Dasumia kusceri (Kratochvíl, 1935) — Macedonia, Bulgaria, Kosovo?
 Dasumia laevigata (Thorell, 1873) (type) — Europe
 Dasumia mariandyna Brignoli, 1979 — Turkey
 Dasumia nativitatis Brignoli, 1974 — Greece
 Dasumia sancticedri Brignoli, 1978 — Lebanon
 Dasumia taeniifera Thorell, 1875 — France, Switzerland, Italy

Dysdera

Dysdera Latreille, 1804
 Dysdera aberrans Gasparo, 2010 — Italy
 Dysdera aciculata Simon, 1882 — Algeria
 Dysdera aculeata Kroneberg, 1875 — Central Asia, Iran? Introduced to Croatia
 Dysdera adriatica Kulczyński, 1897 — Austria, Balkans
 Dysdera affinis Ferrández, 1996 — Spain
 Dysdera afghana Denis, 1958 — Afghanistan
 Dysdera akpinarae Varol, 2016 — Turkey
 Dysdera alegranzaensis Wunderlich, 1992 — Canary Is.
 Dysdera alentejana Ferrández, 1996 — Portugal
 Dysdera ambulotenta Ribera, Ferrández & Blasco, 1986 — Canary Is.
 Dysdera anatoliae Deeleman-Reinhold, 1988 — Turkey
 Dysdera ancora Grasshoff, 1959 — Italy
 Dysdera andamanae Arnedo & Ribera, 1997 — Canary Is.
 Dysdera andreini Caporiacco, 1928 — Italy, Albania
 Dysdera aneris Macías-Hernández & Arnedo, 2010 — Selvagens Is.
 Dysdera anonyma Ferrández, 1984 — Spain
 Dysdera apenninica Alicata, 1964 — Italy
 Dysdera apenninica aprutiana Alicata, 1964 — Italy
 Dysdera arabiafelix Gasparo & van Harten, 2006 — Yemen
 Dysdera arabica Deeleman-Reinhold, 1988 — Oman
 Dysdera arabisenen Arnedo & Ribera, 1997 — Canary Is.
 Dysdera argaeica Nosek, 1905 — Turkey
 Dysdera arganoi Gasparo, 2004 — Italy
 Dysdera armenica Charitonov, 1956 — Armenia, Georgia
 Dysdera arnedoi Lissner, 2017 — Spain (Majorca)
 Dysdera arnoldii Charitonov, 1956 — Central Asia
 Dysdera asiatica Nosek, 1905 — Turkey, Iran (?)
 Dysdera atlantea Denis, 1954 — Morocco
 Dysdera atlantica Simon, 1909 — Morocco
 Dysdera aurgitana Ferrández, 1996 — Spain
 Dysdera azerbajdzhanica Charitonov, 1956 — Caucasus (Russia, Georgia, Azerbaijan)
 Dysdera baetica Ferrández, 1984 — Spain
 Dysdera balearica Thorell, 1873 — Spain (Majorca)
 Dysdera bandamae Schmidt, 1973 — Canary Is.
 Dysdera baratellii Pesarini, 2001 — Italy
 Dysdera beieri Deeleman-Reinhold, 1988 — Greece
 Dysdera bellimundi Deeleman-Reinhold, 1988 — Montenegro, Albania
 Dysdera bernardi Denis, 1966 — Libya
 Dysdera bicolor Taczanowski, 1874 — French Guiana
 Dysdera bicornis Fage, 1931 — Spain
 Dysdera bidentata Dunin, 1990 — Azerbaijan
 Dysdera bogatschevi Dunin, 1990 — Georgia, Azerbaijan
 Dysdera borealicaucasica Dunin, 1991 — Russia (Caucasus)
 Dysdera bottazziae Caporiacco, 1951 — Italy, Croatia
 Dysdera breviseta Wunderlich, 1992 — Canary Is.
 Dysdera brevispina Wunderlich, 1992 — Canary Is.
 Dysdera brignoliana Gasparo, 2000 — Italy
 Dysdera brignolii Dunin, 1989 — Turkmenistan
 Dysdera caeca Ribera, 1993 — Morocco
 Dysdera calderensis Wunderlich, 1987 — Canary Is.
 Dysdera castillonensis Ferrández, 1996 — Spain
 Dysdera catalonica Řezáč, 2018 — Spain
 Dysdera cechica Řezáč, 2018 — Austria, Czechia, Slovakia, Hungary, Serbia?
 Dysdera centroitalica Gasparo, 1997 — Italy
 Dysdera cephalonica Deeleman-Reinhold, 1988 — Greece
 Dysdera charitonowi Mcheidze, 1979 — Georgia
 Dysdera chioensis Wunderlich, 1992 — Canary Is.
 Dysdera circularis Deeleman-Reinhold, 1988 — Greece
 Dysdera coiffaiti Denis, 1962 — Madeira
 Dysdera collucata Dunin, 1991 — Armenia
 Dysdera concinna L. Koch, 1878 — Azerbaijan, Iran (?)
 Dysdera corallina Risso, 1826 — Spain, France
 Dysdera corfuensis Deeleman-Reinhold, 1988 — Albania, Greece (Corfu)
 Dysdera cornipes Karsch, 1881 — Libya
 Dysdera cribellata Simon, 1883 — Canary Is.
 Dysdera cribrata Simon, 1882 — France, Italy, Andorra
 Dysdera cristata Deeleman-Reinhold, 1988 — Syria, Lebanon
 Dysdera crocata C. L. Koch, 1838 — Europe, Caucasus, Iraq, Central Asia. Introduced to North America, Chile, Brazil, Australia, New Zealand, Hawaii
 Dysdera crocata mutica Simon, 1911 — Algeria
 Dysdera crocata parvula Simon, 1911 — Algeria
 Dysdera crocolita Simon, 1911 — Algeria
 Dysdera curviseta Wunderlich, 1987 — Canary Is.
 Dysdera cylindrica O. Pickard-Cambridge, 1885 — Pakistan
 Dysdera daghestanica Dunin, 1991 — Russia (Caucasus)
 Dysdera dentichelis Simon, 1882 — Lebanon
 Dysdera deserticola Simon, 1911 — Algeria
 Dysdera diversa Blackwall, 1862 — Madeira
 Dysdera dolanskyi Řezáč, 2018 — Spain
 Dysdera drescoi Ribera, 1983 — Morocco
 Dysdera dubrovninnii Deeleman-Reinhold, 1988 — SE Europe (Balkans), Romania, Slovakia
 Dysdera dunini Deeleman-Reinhold, 1988 — Greece, Turkey, Ukraine, Caucasus (Russia, Georgia, Azerbaijan)
 Dysdera dysderoides (Caporiacco, 1947) — Ethiopia
 Dysdera edumifera Ferrández, 1983 — Spain
 Dysdera enghoffi Arnedo, Oromí & Ribera, 1997 — Canary Is.
 Dysdera enguriensis Deeleman-Reinhold, 1988 — Turkey
 Dysdera erythrina (Walckenaer, 1802) (type) — Southwestern and Western to Central Europe
 Dysdera espanoli Ribera & Ferrández, 1986 — Spain
 Dysdera esquiveli Ribera & Blasco, 1986 — Canary Is.
 Dysdera fabrorum Řezáč, 2018 — Spain
 Dysdera falciformis Barrientos & Ferrández, 1982 — Spain
 Dysdera fedtschenkoi Dunin, 1992 — Tajikistan
 Dysdera ferghanica Dunin, 1985 — Kyrgyzstan
 Dysdera fervida Simon, 1882 — France (Corsica), Spain (Balearic Is.)?
 Dysdera festai Caporiacco, 1929 — Greece (Rhodes)
 Dysdera flagellata Grasshoff, 1959 — Italy
 Dysdera flagellifera Caporiacco, 1947 — Italy
 Dysdera flagellifera aeoliensis Alicata, 1973 — Italy
 Dysdera flavitarsis Simon, 1882 — Spain
 Dysdera fragaria Deeleman-Reinhold, 1988 — Greece (Rhodes)
 Dysdera furcata Varol & Danışman, 2018 — Turkey
 Dysdera fuscipes Simon, 1882 — Portugal, Spain, France
 Dysdera fustigans Alicata, 1966 — Italy
 Dysdera galinae Dimitrov, 2018 — Turkey
 Dysdera gamarrae Ferrández, 1984 — Spain
 Dysdera garrafensis Řezáč, 2018 — Spain
 Dysdera gemina Deeleman-Reinhold, 1988 — Israel
 Dysdera ghilarovi Dunin, 1987 — Azerbaijan
 Dysdera gibbifera Wunderlich, 1992 — Canary Is.
 Dysdera gigas Roewer, 1928 — Greece (Crete)
 Dysdera gmelini Dunin, 1991 — Georgia
 Dysdera gollumi Ribera & Arnedo, 1994 — Canary Is.
 Dysdera gomerensis Strand, 1911 — Canary Is.
 Dysdera graia Řezáč, 2018 — France
 Dysdera granulata Kulczyński, 1897 — Italy, Balkans, Albania
 Dysdera gruberi Deeleman-Reinhold, 1988 — Turkey
 Dysdera guayota Arnedo & Ribera, 1999 — Canary Is.
 Dysdera halkidikii Deeleman-Reinhold, 1988 — Macedonia, Greece
 Dysdera hamifera Simon, 1911 — Algeria
 Dysdera hamifera macellina Simon, 1911 — Algeria
 Dysdera hattusas Deeleman-Reinhold, 1988 — Turkey
 Dysdera helenae Ferrández, 1996 — Spain
 Dysdera hernandezi Arnedo & Ribera, 1999 — Canary Is.
 Dysdera hiemalis Deeleman-Reinhold, 1988 — Greece (Crete)
 Dysdera hirguan Arnedo, Oromí & Ribera, 1997 — Canary Is.
 Dysdera hirsti Denis, 1945 — Algeria
 Dysdera hungarica Kulczyński, 1897 — Central Europe to Azerbaijan
 Dysdera hungarica atra Mcheidze, 1979 — Georgia, Azerbaijan
 Dysdera hungarica subalpina Dunin, 1992 — Russia (Caucasus)
 Dysdera iguanensis Wunderlich, 1987 — Canary Is.
 Dysdera imeretiensis Mcheidze, 1979 — Georgia
 Dysdera incertissima Denis, 1961 — Morocco
 Dysdera incognita Dunin, 1991 — Russia (Europe, Caucasus)
 Dysdera inermis Ferrández, 1984 — Spain
 Dysdera inopinata Dunin, 1991 — Georgia
 Dysdera insulana Simon, 1883 — Canary Is.
 Dysdera jana Gasparo & Arnedo, 2009 — Italy (Sardinia)
 Dysdera karabachica Dunin, 1990 — Azerbaijan
 Dysdera kati Komnenov & Chatzaki, 2016 — Greece
 Dysdera kollari Doblika, 1853 — Italy, Balkans, Greece, Turkey
 Dysdera krisis Komnenov & Chatzaki, 2016 — Greece, Turkey
 Dysdera kronebergi Dunin, 1992 — Tajikistan
 Dysdera kropfi Řezáč, 2018 — Switzerland
 Dysdera kugitangica Dunin, 1992 — Turkmenistan
 Dysdera kulczynskii Simon, 1914 — France, Italy
 Dysdera kusnetsovi Dunin, 1989 — Turkmenistan
 Dysdera labradaensis Wunderlich, 1992 — Canary Is.
 Dysdera lagrecai Alicata, 1964 — Italy
 Dysdera lancerotensis Simon, 1907 — Canary Is.
 Dysdera lantosquensis Simon, 1882 — France, Italy
 Dysdera lata Reuss, 1834 — Mediterranean to Georgia
 Dysdera laterispina Pesarini, 2001 — Greece
 Dysdera leprieuri Simon, 1882 — Algeria
 Dysdera levipes Wunderlich, 1987 — Canary Is.
 Dysdera ligustica Gasparo, 1997 — Italy
 Dysdera limitanea Dunin, 1985 — Turkmenistan
 Dysdera limnos Deeleman-Reinhold, 1988 — Greece
 Dysdera liostetha Simon, 1907 — Canary Is.
 Dysdera littoralis Denis, 1962 — Morocco
 Dysdera longa Wunderlich, 1992 — Canary Is.
 Dysdera longibulbis Denis, 1962 — Madeira
 Dysdera longimandibularis Nosek, 1905 — Turkey, Cyprus
 Dysdera longirostris Doblika, 1853 — Central to southeastern and eastern Europe, Turkey, Caucasus
 Dysdera lubrica Simon, 1907 — Egypt
 Dysdera lucidipes Simon, 1882 — Algeria
 Dysdera lucidipes melillensis Simon, 1911 — Morocco
 Dysdera lusitanica Kulczyński, 1915 — Portugal, Spain
 Dysdera machadoi Ferrández, 1996 — Portugal, Spain
 Dysdera macra Simon, 1883 — Canary Is.
 Dysdera madai Arnedo, 2007 — Canary Is.
 Dysdera mahan Macías-Hernández & Arnedo, 2010 — Canary Is.
 Dysdera maronita Gasparo, 2003 — Lebanon
 Dysdera martensi Dunin, 1991 — Caucasus (Russia, Georgia)
 Dysdera mauritanica Simon, 1909 — Morocco
 Dysdera mauritanica aurantiaca Simon, 1909 — Morocco
 Dysdera maurusia Thorell, 1873 — Algeria, Hungary?, Slovakia?, USA?
 Dysdera mazini Dunin, 1991 — Armenia, Azerbaijan
 Dysdera meschetiensis Mcheidze, 1979 — Georgia
 Dysdera microdonta Gasparo, 2014 — Italy, Austria, Slovenia, Serbia
 Dysdera minairo Řezáč, 2018 — Spain
 Dysdera minuta Deeleman-Reinhold, 1988 — Greece (Rhodes)
 Dysdera minutissima Wunderlich, 1992 — Canary Is.
 Dysdera mixta Deeleman-Reinhold, 1988 — Turkey
 Dysdera montanetensis Wunderlich, 1992 — Canary Is.
 Dysdera monterossoi Alicata, 1964 — Italy
 Dysdera moravica Řezáč, 2014 — Germany to Romania
 Dysdera mucronata Simon, 1911 — Morocco, Spain
 Dysdera murphyorum Deeleman-Reinhold, 1988 — Albania, Greece (Corfu)
 Dysdera nakhchivanica Beydizade, Shafaie & Guseinov, 2018 — Azerbaijan
 Dysdera nenilini Dunin, 1989 — Turkmenistan
 Dysdera neocretica Deeleman-Reinhold, 1988 — Greece (Crete), Turkey
 Dysdera nesiotes Simon, 1907 — Selvagens Is., Canary Is.
 Dysdera nicaeensis Thorell, 1873 — France, Italy
 Dysdera ninnii Canestrini, 1868 — Switzerland, Italy, Slovenia, Croatia
 Dysdera nomada Simon, 1911 — Tunisia
 Dysdera nubila Simon, 1882 — France (Corsica), Italy
 Dysdera orahan Arnedo, Oromí & Ribera, 1997 — Canary Is.
 Dysdera ortunoi Ferrández, 1996 — Spain
 Dysdera osellai Alicata, 1973 — Italy
 Dysdera paganettii Deeleman-Reinhold, 1988 — Italy
 Dysdera pamirica Dunin, 1992 — Tajikistan
 Dysdera pandazisi Hadjissarantos, 1940 — Greece
 Dysdera paucispinosa Wunderlich, 1992 — Canary Is.
 Dysdera pavani Caporiacco, 1941 — Italy
 Dysdera pectinata Deeleman-Reinhold, 1988 — Bulgaria, Macedonia, Greece
 Dysdera pharaonis Simon, 1907 — Egypt
 Dysdera pococki Dunin, 1985 — Turkmenistan
 Dysdera pominii Caporiacco, 1947 — Italy
 Dysdera portisancti Wunderlich, 1995 — Madeira
 Dysdera portsensis Řezáč, 2018 — Spain
 Dysdera pradesensis Řezáč, 2018 — Spain
 Dysdera praepostera Denis, 1961 — Morocco
 Dysdera presai Ferrández, 1984 — Spain
 Dysdera pretneri Deeleman-Reinhold, 1988 — Croatia, Montenegro, Greece
 Dysdera pristiphora Pesarini, 2001 — Italy
 Dysdera punctata C. L. Koch, 1838 — Southern Europe, Slovakia?, Georgia?
 Dysdera punctocretica Deeleman-Reinhold, 1988 — Greece (Corfu)
 Dysdera pyrenaica Řezáč, 2018 — Spain
 Dysdera quindecima Řezáč, 2018 — Spain
 Dysdera raddei Dunin, 1990 — Azerbaijan
 Dysdera ramblae Arnedo, Oromí & Ribera, 1997 — Canary Is.
 Dysdera ratonensis Wunderlich, 1992 — Canary Is.
 Dysdera ravida Simon, 1909 — Morocco
 Dysdera richteri Charitonov, 1956 — Azerbaijan, Armenia, Georgia
 Dysdera roemeri Strand, 1906 — Ethiopia
 Dysdera romana Gasparo & Di Franco, 2008 — Italy
 Dysdera romantica Deeleman-Reinhold, 1988 — Greece
 Dysdera rostrata Denis, 1961 — Morocco
 Dysdera rubus Deeleman-Reinhold, 1988 — Turkey, Greece
 Dysdera rudis Simon, 1882 — France
 Dysdera rugichelis Simon, 1907 — Canary Is.
 Dysdera rullii Pesarini, 2001 — Italy
 Dysdera sanborondon Arnedo, Oromí & Ribera, 2000 — Canary Is.
 Dysdera satunini Dunin, 1990 — Azerbaijan
 Dysdera scabricula Simon, 1882 — France, Spain
 Dysdera sciakyi Pesarini, 2001 — Greece
 Dysdera seclusa Denis, 1961 — Morocco
 Dysdera sefrensis Simon, 1911 — Morocco
 Dysdera septima Řezáč, 2018 — Spain
 Dysdera shardana Opatova & Arnedo, 2009 — Italy (Sardinia)
 Dysdera sibyllina Arnedo, 2007 — Canary Is.
 Dysdera sibyllinica Kritscher, 1956 — Italy
 Dysdera silana Alicata, 1965 — Italy
 Dysdera silvatica Schmidt, 1981 — Canary Is.
 Dysdera simbeque Macías-Hernández & Arnedo, 2010 — Canary Is.
 Dysdera simoni Deeleman-Reinhold, 1988 — Syria, Israel, Lebanon
 Dysdera snassenica Simon, 1911 — Morocco, Algeria
 Dysdera snassenica collina Simon, 1911 — Morocco
 Dysdera soleata Karsch, 1881 — Libya
 Dysdera solers Walckenaer, 1837 — Colombia
 Dysdera spasskyi Charitonov, 1956 — Georgia
 Dysdera spinicrus Simon, 1882 — Balkans, Greece, Syria
 Dysdera spinidorsa Wunderlich, 1992 — Canary Is.
 Dysdera stahlavskyi Řezáč, 2018 — France
 Dysdera subcylindrica Charitonov, 1956 — Central Asia
 Dysdera subnubila Simon, 1907 — Italy, Tunisia, Egypt
 Dysdera subsquarrosa Simon, 1914 — France, Italy
 Dysdera sultani Deeleman-Reinhold, 1988 — Greece, Turkey
 Dysdera sutoria Denis, 1945 — Morocco
 Dysdera tartarica Kroneberg, 1875 — Central Asia
 Dysdera tbilisiensis Mcheidze, 1979 — Georgia
 Dysdera tenuistyla Denis, 1961 — Morocco
 Dysdera tezcani Varol & Akpınar, 2016 — Turkey
 Dysdera tilosensis Wunderlich, 1992 — Canary Is.
 Dysdera topcui Gasparo, 2008 — Turkey
 Dysdera tredecima Řezáč, 2018 — Spain
 Dysdera turcica Varol, 2016 — Turkey
 Dysdera tystshenkoi Dunin, 1989 — Turkmenistan
 Dysdera ukrainensis Charitonov, 1956 — Ukraine, Russia (Europe), Georgia
 Dysdera undecima Řezáč, 2018 — Spain
 Dysdera unguimmanis Ribera, Ferrández & Blasco, 1986 — Canary Is.
 Dysdera valentina Ribera, 2004 — Spain
 Dysdera vandeli Denis, 1962 — Madeira
 Dysdera veigai Ferrández, 1984 — Spain
 Dysdera ventricosa Grasshoff, 1959 — Italy
 Dysdera vermicularis Berland, 1936 — Cape Verde Is.
 Dysdera verneaui Simon, 1883 — Canary Is.
 Dysdera vesiculifera Simon, 1882 — Algeria
 Dysdera vignai Gasparo, 2003 — Lebanon
 Dysdera vivesi Ribera & Ferrández, 1986 — Spain
 Dysdera volcania Ribera, Ferrández & Blasco, 1986 — Canary Is.
 Dysdera werneri Deeleman-Reinhold, 1988 — Greece
 Dysdera westringi O. Pickard-Cambridge, 1872 — Eastern Mediterranean, Iraq
 Dysdera yguanirae Arnedo & Ribera, 1997 — Canary Is.
 Dysdera yozgat Deeleman-Reinhold, 1988 — Turkey
 Dysdera zarudnyi Charitonov, 1956 — Central Asia, Afghanistan

Dysderella

Dysderella Dunin, 1992
 Dysderella caspica (Dunin, 1990) — Azerbaijan
 Dysderella transcaspica (Dunin & Fet, 1985) (type) — Turkmenistan, Iran

Dysderocrates

Dysderocrates Deeleman-Reinhold & Deeleman, 1988
 Dysderocrates egregius (Kulczyński, 1897) — Hungary, Romania
 Dysderocrates gasparoi Deeleman-Reinhold, 1988 — Greece (Corfu)
 Dysderocrates kibrisensis Gücel, Charalambidou, Göçmen & Kunt, 2019 — Cyprus
 Dysderocrates marani (Kratochvíl, 1937) — Greece (Crete)
 Dysderocrates regina Deeleman-Reinhold, 1988 — Turkey
 Dysderocrates silvestris Deeleman-Reinhold, 1988 — Bosnia-Hercegovina, Montenegro
 Dysderocrates storkani (Kratochvíl, 1935) (type) — SE Europe (Balkans)
 Dysderocrates tanatmisi Karakaş Kiliç & Özkütük, 2017 — Turkey

F

Folkia

Folkia Kratochvíl, 1970
 Folkia boudewijni Deeleman-Reinhold, 1993 — Croatia
 Folkia haasi (Reimoser, 1929) — Croatia
 Folkia inermis (Absolon & Kratochvíl, 1933) (type) — Croatia
 Folkia lugens Brignoli, 1974 — Greece
 Folkia mrazeki (Nosek, 1904) — Montenegro
 Folkia pauciaculeata (Fage, 1943) — Bosnia-Hercegovina
 Folkia subcupressa Deeleman-Reinhold, 1993 — Croatia

H

Harpactea

Harpactea Bristowe, 1939
 Harpactea abantia (Simon, 1884) — Greece
 Harpactea achsuensis Dunin, 1991 — Azerbaijan
 Harpactea acuta Beladjal & Bosmans, 1997 — Algeria
 Harpactea aeoliensis Alicata, 1973 — Italy
 Harpactea agnolettii Brignoli, 1978 — Turkey
 Harpactea alanyana Özkütük, Elverici, Marusik & Kunt, 2015 — Turkey
 Harpactea albanica (Caporiacco, 1949) — Albania
 Harpactea alexandrae Lazarov, 2006 — Bulgaria, Romania, Ukraine, Russia (Europe)
 Harpactea algarvensis Ferrández, 1990 — Portugal
 Harpactea alicatai Brignoli, 1979 — Italy (Sardinia)
 Harpactea angustata (Lucas, 1846) — Algeria
 Harpactea antoni Bosmans, 2009 — Greece
 Harpactea apollinea Brignoli, 1979 — Greece
 Harpactea arguta (Simon, 1907) — France, Italy
 Harpactea armenica Dunin, 1989 — Armenia
 Harpactea arnedoi Kunt, Elverici, Özkütük & Yağmur, 2011 — Turkey
 Harpactea asparuhi Lazarov, 2008 — Bulgaria
 Harpactea auresensis Bosmans & Beladjal, 1991 — Algeria
 Harpactea auriga (Simon, 1911) — Algeria
 Harpactea aurigoides Bosmans & Beladjal, 1991 — Algeria
 Harpactea azerbajdzhanica Dunin, 1991 — Azerbaijan
 Harpactea azowensis Charitonov, 1956 — Ukraine, Russia (Europe)
 Harpactea babori (Nosek, 1905) — Bulgaria, Greece, Turkey
 Harpactea ballarini Kunt, Özkütük & Elverici, 2013 — Turkey
 Harpactea blasi Ribera & Ferrández, 1986 — Spain
 Harpactea buchari Dunin, 1991 — Azerbaijan
 Harpactea bulgarica Lazarov & Naumova, 2010 — Macedonia, Bulgaria
 Harpactea caligata Beladjal & Bosmans, 1997 — Algeria
 Harpactea carusoi Alicata, 1974 — Italy, Tunisia
 Harpactea catholica (Brignoli, 1984) — Greece (Crete)
 Harpactea caucasia (Kulczyński, 1895) — Russia (Caucasus), Georgia
 Harpactea cecconii (Kulczyński, 1908) — Cyprus
 Harpactea cesari Van Keer, 2009 — Greece
 Harpactea chreensis Bosmans & Beladjal, 1989 — Algeria
 Harpactea christae Bosmans & Beladjal, 1991 — Algeria
 Harpactea christodeltshevi Bayram, Kunt & Yağmur, 2009 — Turkey
 Harpactea clementi Bosmans, 2009 — Greece, Turkey
 Harpactea coccifera Brignoli, 1984 — Greece (Crete)
 Harpactea colchidis Brignoli, 1978 — Turkey
 Harpactea complicata Deltshev, 2011 — Serbia
 Harpactea corinthia Brignoli, 1984 — Greece
 Harpactea corticalis (Simon, 1882) — France, Italy
 Harpactea cressa Brignoli, 1984 — Greece (Crete)
 Harpactea cruriformis Bosmans, 2011 — Greece
 Harpactea dashdamirovi Dunin, 1993 — Azerbaijan
 Harpactea deelemanae Dunin, 1989 — Armenia
 Harpactea deltshevi Dimitrov & Lazarov, 1999 — Bulgaria
 Harpactea digiovannii Gasparo, 2014 — Greece
 Harpactea diraoi Brignoli, 1978 — Turkey
 Harpactea dobati Alicata, 1974 — Turkey
 Harpactea doblikae (Thorell, 1875) — Ukraine (mainland, Crimea)
 Harpactea dufouri (Thorell, 1873) — Spain
 Harpactea dumonti Bosmans & Beladjal, 1991 — Algeria
 Harpactea eskovi Dunin, 1989 — Georgia, Armenia
 Harpactea fageli Brignoli, 1980 — Portugal, Spain
 Harpactea forceps Varol & Danışman, 2018 — Turkey
 Harpactea forcipifera (Simon, 1911) — Algeria
 Harpactea gaditana Pesarini, 1988 — Spain
 Harpactea galatica Brignoli, 1978 — Turkey
 Harpactea gennargentu Wunderlich, 1995 — Italy (Sardinia)
 Harpactea globifera (Simon, 1911) — Algeria
 Harpactea golovatchi Dunin, 1989 — Armenia
 Harpactea gridellii (Caporiacco, 1951) — Italy
 Harpactea grisea (Canestrini, 1868) — Switzerland, Austria, Italy, Slovenia
 Harpactea gunselorum Gücel, Fuller, Göçmen & Kunt, 2018 — Cyprus
 Harpactea hauseri Brignoli, 1976 — Greece
 Harpactea heizerensis Bosmans & Beladjal, 1991 — Algeria
 Harpactea heliconia Brignoli, 1984 — Greece
 Harpactea henschi (Kulczyński, 1915) — Bosnia-Hercegovina
 Harpactea herodis Brignoli, 1978 — Israel
 Harpactea hispana (Simon, 1882) — Spain, France
 Harpactea hombergi (Scopoli, 1763) (type) — Europe
 Harpactea hyrcanica Dunin, 1991 — Azerbaijan
 Harpactea ice Komnenov & Chatzaki, 2016 — Greece
 Harpactea incerta Brignoli, 1979 — Greece
 Harpactea incurvata Bosmans & Beladjal, 1991 — Algeria
 Harpactea indistincta Dunin, 1991 — Russia (Caucasus), Azerbaijan
 Harpactea innupta Beladjal & Bosmans, 1997 — Algeria
 Harpactea isaurica Brignoli, 1978 — Turkey
 Harpactea johannitica Brignoli, 1976 — Greece
 Harpactea kalaensis Beladjal & Bosmans, 1997 — Algeria
 Harpactea kalavachiana Gücel, Charalambidou, Göçmen & Kunt, 2019 — Cyprus
 Harpactea karabachica Dunin, 1991 — Azerbaijan
 Harpactea karaschkhan Kunt, Özkütük, Elverici, Marusik & Karakaş, 2016 — Turkey
 Harpactea kareli Bosmans & Beladjal, 1991 — Algeria
 Harpactea kencei Kunt, Elverici, Özkütük & Yağmur, 2011 — Turkey
 Harpactea konradi Lazarov, 2009 — Bulgaria
 Harpactea korgei Brignoli, 1979 — Turkey
 Harpactea krueperi (Simon, 1884) — Greece
 Harpactea krumi Lazarov, 2010 — Bulgaria
 Harpactea kubrati Lazarov, 2008 — Bulgaria
 Harpactea kulczynskii Brignoli, 1976 — Greece
 Harpactea lazarovi Deltshev, 2011 — Bulgaria
 Harpactea lazonum Brignoli, 1978 — Turkey
 Harpactea lepida (C. L. Koch, 1838) — Europe
 Harpactea loebli Brignoli, 1974 — Greece
 Harpactea logunovi Dunin, 1992 — Russia (Caucasus), Georgia
 Harpactea longitarsa Alicata, 1974 — Algeria, Tunisia
 Harpactea longobarda Pesarini, 2001 — Italy, Ukraine
 Harpactea maelfaiti Beladjal & Bosmans, 1997 — Algeria
 Harpactea magnibulbi Machado & Ferrández, 1991 — Portugal
 Harpactea major (Simon, 1911) — Algeria
 Harpactea mariae Komnenov, 2014 — Macedonia
 Harpactea martensi Dunin, 1991 — Azerbaijan
 Harpactea mcheidzeae Dunin, 1992 — Georgia
 Harpactea medeae Brignoli, 1978 — Turkey
 Harpactea mehennii Bosmans & Beladjal, 1989 — Algeria
 Harpactea mentor Lazarov & Naumova, 2010 — Bulgaria
 Harpactea mertensi Bosmans & Beladjal, 1991 — Algeria
 Harpactea minoccii Ferrández, 1982 — Spain
 Harpactea minuta Alicata, 1974 — Tunisia
 Harpactea mithridatis Brignoli, 1979 — Turkey, Georgia
 Harpactea mitidjae Bosmans & Beladjal, 1991 — Algeria
 Harpactea modesta Dunin, 1991 — Russia (Caucasus), Azerbaijan
 Harpactea monicae Bosmans & Beladjal, 1991 — Algeria
 Harpactea mouzaiensis Bosmans & Beladjal, 1989 — Algeria
 Harpactea muscicola (Simon, 1882) — France (Corsica)
 Harpactea nachitschevanica Dunin, 1991 — Azerbaijan
 Harpactea nausicaae Brignoli, 1976 — Macedonia, Greece
 Harpactea nenilini Dunin, 1989 — Armenia
 Harpactea nuragica Alicata, 1966 — Italy (Sardinia)
 Harpactea oglasana Gasparo, 1992 — Italy
 Harpactea oranensis Bosmans & Beladjal, 1991 — Algeria
 Harpactea ortegai Ribera & De Mas, 2003 — Spain
 Harpactea osellai Brignoli, 1978 — Turkey
 Harpactea ouarsenensis Bosmans & Beladjal, 1991 — Algeria
 Harpactea ovata Beladjal & Bosmans, 1997 — Algeria
 Harpactea paradoxa Dunin, 1992 — Georgia
 Harpactea parthica Brignoli, 1980 — Iran, Turkmenistan?
 Harpactea persephone Gasparo, 2011 — Greece (Crete)
 Harpactea petrovi Lazarov & Dimitrov, 2018 — Bulgaria
 Harpactea piligera (Thorell, 1875) — Italy
 Harpactea pisidica Brignoli, 1978 — Turkey
 Harpactea popovi Dimitrov, Deltshev & Lazarov, 2019 — Bulgaria
 Harpactea proxima Ferrández, 1990 — Portugal
 Harpactea pugio Varol & Akpınar, 2016 — Turkey
 Harpactea punica Alicata, 1974 — Algeria, Tunisia
 Harpactea reniformis Beladjal & Bosmans, 1997 — Algeria
 Harpactea rubicunda (C. L. Koch, 1838) — Europe, Georgia
 Harpactea rucnerorum Polenec & Thaler, 1975 — Croatia
 Harpactea ruffoi Alicata, 1974 — Tunisia
 Harpactea rugichelis Denis, 1955 — Lebanon
 Harpactea sadistica Řezáč, 2008 — Israel
 Harpactea saeva (Herman, 1879) — Slovakia, Hungary, southeastern Europe to Ukraine
 Harpactea samuili Lazarov, 2006 — Bulgaria
 Harpactea sanctaeinsulae Brignoli, 1978 — Turkey
 Harpactea sanctidomini Gasparo, 1997 — Italy
 Harpactea sardoa Alicata, 1966 — Italy
 Harpactea sbordonii Brignoli, 1978 — Turkey
 Harpactea sciakyi Pesarini, 1988 — Spain
 Harpactea secunda Dunin, 1989 — Armenia
 Harpactea senalbensis Beladjal & Bosmans, 1997 — Algeria
 Harpactea serena (Simon, 1907) — Spain, France
 Harpactea sicula Alicata, 1966 — Italy (Sicily)
 Harpactea simovi Deltshev & Lazarov, 2018 — Bulgaria
 Harpactea sinuata Beladjal & Bosmans, 1997 — Algeria
 Harpactea spasskyi Dunin, 1992 — Ukraine (Crimea), Russia (Caucasus)
 Harpactea spirembolus Russell-Smith, 2011 — Greece
 Harpactea srednagora Dimitrov & Lazarov, 1999 — Macedonia, Bulgaria
 Harpactea stalitoides Ribera, 1993 — Portugal
 Harpactea stoevi Deltshev & Lazarov, 2018 — Bulgaria
 Harpactea strandi (Caporiacco, 1939) — Italy
 Harpactea strandjica Dimitrov, 1997 — Bulgaria, Turkey
 Harpactea strinatii Brignoli, 1979 — Greece
 Harpactea sturanyi (Nosek, 1905) — Greece, Turkey, Georgia
 Harpactea subiasi Ferrández, 1990 — Portugal
 Harpactea talyschica Dunin, 1991 — Azerbaijan
 Harpactea tenuiemboli Deltshev, 2011 — Serbia
 Harpactea tergestina Gasparo, 2014 — Italy
 Harpactea terveli Lazarov, 2009 — Bulgaria, Turkey
 Harpactea thaleri Alicata, 1966 — Switzerland, Italy
 Harpactea undosa Beladjal & Bosmans, 1997 — Algeria
 Harpactea vagabunda Dunin, 1991 — Azerbaijan
 Harpactea vignai Brignoli, 1978 — Turkey
 Harpactea villehardouini Brignoli, 1979 — Greece
 Harpactea wolfgangi Komnenov & Chatzaki, 2016 — Greece
 Harpactea yakourensis Beladjal & Bosmans, 1997 — Algeria
 Harpactea zaitzevi Charitonov, 1956 — Georgia, Azerbaijan, Armenia
 Harpactea zannonensis Alicata, 1966 — Italy
 Harpactea zjuzini Dunin, 1991 — Azerbaijan
 Harpactea zoiai Gasparo, 1999 — Greece

Harpactocrates

Harpactocrates Simon, 1914
 Harpactocrates apennicola Simon, 1914 — France, Italy
 Harpactocrates cazorlensis Ferrández, 1986 — Spain
 Harpactocrates drassoides (Simon, 1882) (type) — Western Europe
 Harpactocrates escuderoi Ferrández, 1986 — Spain
 Harpactocrates globifer Ferrández, 1986 — Spain
 Harpactocrates gredensis Ferrández, 1986 — Spain
 Harpactocrates gurdus Simon, 1914 — Spain, France
 Harpactocrates intermedius Dalmas, 1915 — France, Italy
 Harpactocrates meridionalis Ferrández & Martin, 1986 — Spain
 Harpactocrates radulifer Simon, 1914 — Spain, France
 Harpactocrates ravastellus Simon, 1914 — Spain, France
 Harpactocrates trialetiensis Mcheidze, 1997 — Georgia
 Harpactocrates troglophilus Brignoli, 1978 — Turkey

Holissus

Holissus Simon, 1882
 Holissus unciger Simon, 1882 (type) — France (Corsica)

Hygrocrates

Hygrocrates Deeleman-Reinhold, 1988
 Hygrocrates caucasicus Dunin, 1992 — Georgia
 Hygrocrates deelemanus Kunt & Yağmur, 2011 — Turkey
 Hygrocrates georgicus (Mcheidze, 1972) — Georgia
 Hygrocrates kovblyuki Kunt & Marusik, 2013 — Turkey
 Hygrocrates lycaoniae (Brignoli, 1978) (type) — Greece (Rhodes), Turkey

K

Kaemis

Kaemis Deeleman-Reinhold, 1993
 Kaemis aeruginosus (Barrientos, Espuny & Ascaso, 1994) — Spain
 Kaemis carnicus Gasparo, 1995 — Italy
 Kaemis circe (Brignoli, 1975) — Italy
 Kaemis gasparoi Mazzoleni & Pantini, 2018 — Italy
 Kaemis vernalis Deeleman-Reinhold, 1993 (type) — Montenegro

M

Mesostalita

Mesostalita Deeleman-Reinhold, 1971
 Mesostalita comottii (Gasparo, 1999) — Croatia
 Mesostalita kratochvili Deeleman-Reinhold, 1971 (type) — Bosnia-Hercegovina
 Mesostalita nocturna (Roewer, 1931) — Italy, Slovenia

Minotauria

Minotauria Kulczyński, 1903
 Minotauria attemsi Kulczyński, 1903 (type) — Greece (Crete)
 Minotauria fagei (Kratochvíl, 1970) — Greece (Crete)

P

Parachtes

Parachtes Alicata, 1964
 Parachtes andreinii Alicata, 1966 — Italy
 Parachtes cantabrorum (Simon, 1914) — Spain, France
 Parachtes deminutus (Denis, 1957) — Spain
 Parachtes ignavus (Simon, 1882) — Spain, France (mainland, Corsica)
 Parachtes inaequipes (Simon, 1882) — France (Corsica)
 Parachtes latialis Alicata, 1966 — Italy
 Parachtes limbarae (Kraus, 1955) — Sardinia
 Parachtes loboi Jiménez-Valverde, Barriga & Moreno, 2006 — Spain
 Parachtes riberai Bosmans, 2017 — Spain (Majorca)
 Parachtes romandiolae (Caporiacco, 1949) — Italy
 Parachtes siculus (Caporiacco, 1949) — Italy
 Parachtes teruelis (Kraus, 1955) — Spain
 Parachtes vernae (Caporiacco, 1936) (type) — Italy

Parastalita

Parastalita Absolon & Kratochvíl, 1932
 Parastalita stygia (Joseph, 1882) (type) — Bosnia-Hercegovina

R

Rhode

Rhode Simon, 1882
 Rhode aspinifera (Nikolic, 1963) — Slovenia
 Rhode baborensis Beladjal & Bosmans, 1996 — Algeria
 Rhode biscutata Simon, 1893 — Mediterranean
 Rhode magnifica Deeleman-Reinhold, 1978 — Montenegro
 Rhode scutiventris Simon, 1882 (type) — Portugal, Spain, Morocco, Algeria
 Rhode stalitoides Deeleman-Reinhold, 1978 — Bosnia-Hercegovina
 Rhode subterranea (Kratochvíl, 1935) — Bosnia-Hercegovina
 Rhode tenuipes (Simon, 1882) — France (Corsica)
 Rhode testudinea Pesarini, 1984 — Italy

Rhodera

Rhodera Deeleman-Reinhold, 1989
 Rhodera hypogea Deeleman-Reinhold, 1989 (type) — Greece (Crete)

S

Sardostalita

Sardostalita Gasparo, 1999
 Sardostalita patrizii (Roewer, 1956) (type) — Sardinia

Speleoharpactea

Speleoharpactea Ribera, 1982
 Speleoharpactea levantina Ribera, 1982 (type) — Spain

Stalagtia

Stalagtia Kratochvíl, 1970
 Stalagtia argus Brignoli, 1976 — Greece
 Stalagtia christoi Van Keer & Bosmans, 2009 — Greece
 Stalagtia hercegovinensis (Nosek, 1905) (type) — SE Europe (Balkans), Turkey
 Stalagtia kratochvili Brignoli, 1976 — Greece
 Stalagtia monospina (Absolon & Kratochvíl, 1933) — Montenegro
 Stalagtia skadarensis Kratochvíl, 1970 — Montenegro
 Stalagtia thaleriana Chatzaki & Arnedo, 2006 — Greece (Crete), Turkey

Stalita

Stalita Schiödte, 1847
 Stalita hadzii Kratochvíl, 1934 — Slovenia
 Stalita inermifemur Roewer, 1931 — Slovenia, Croatia
 Stalita pretneri Deeleman-Reinhold, 1971 — Croatia
 Stalita taenaria Schiödte, 1847 (type) — Italy, Slovenia, Croatia

Stalitella

Stalitella Absolon & Kratochvíl, 1932
 Stalitella noseki Absolon & Kratochvíl, 1933 (type) — Bosnia-Hercegovina, Montenegro

Stalitochara

Stalitochara Simon, 1913
 Stalitochara kabiliana Simon, 1913 (type) — Algeria

T

Tedia

Tedia Simon, 1882
 Tedia abdominalis Deeleman-Reinhold, 1988 — Israel, Syria
 Tedia oxygnatha Simon, 1882 (type) — Syria, Iran?

References

Dysderidae
Dysderidae